Pablo Carreño-Busta was the defending champion but decided not to participate.
Andreas Haider-Maurer won the title by defeating João Sousa 6–3, 6–4 in the final.

Seeds

Draw

Finals

Top half

Bottom half

References
 Main Draw
 Qualifying Draw

Citta di Como Challenger - Singles
2012 Singles